Narada is a sage from early Hindu texts.

Narada may also refer to:

People
 Narada, one of the 28 Buddhas said to have attained enlightenment from the time Gautama Buddha attained his first definite prophecy from Dipankara Buddha
 Narada Bakmeewewa, a Sri Lanka television presenter and actor
 Narada Bernard (b. 1981), a Jamaican football (soccer) player
 Narada Maha Thera (1898-1983), a Sri Lankan Buddhist monk
 Narada Michael Walden (b. 1952), an American music producer, drummer, singer, and songwriter

Other uses
 Narada, a place name in Yamanashi Prefecture, Japan
 Ňárad, a village and municipality of south-west Slovakia
 Narada News, a defunct Indian online news portal
 Narada Productions, a record label
 Narada multicast protocol, an overlay protocol for multicast communication on computer networks
 Narada, a Romulan mining vessel from the future in the 2009 film Star Trek
 Narada Purana, a Hindu religious text
 USS Narada (SP-161), a United States Navy patrol vessel in commission from 1917 to 1919

See also
 Narda (disambiguation)